Thermosyntropha lipolytica is a lipolytic, anaerobic, alkalitolerant, thermophilic bacteria. It lives in syntrophic coculture with a methanogen. Its cells are non-motile, non-spore forming, straight or slightly curved rods. Its type strain is JW/VS-265T (=DSM 11003).

References

Further reading
Staley, James T., et al. "Bergey's manual of systematic bacteriology, vol. 3. "Williams and Wilkins, Baltimore, MD (2012).

External links 
LPSN

Type strain of Thermosyntropha lipolytica at BacDive -  the Bacterial Diversity Metadatabase

Eubacteriales
Bacteria described in 1996